Jaltocan is a town and one of the 84 municipalities of Hidalgo, in central-eastern Mexico. The municipality covers an area of 48.8 km². The origin of its name comes from the word Xaltocan, of origin Náhuatl, which translates to "Place where it is sown in sand"

As of 2005, the municipality had a total population of 10,265. In 2017 there were 9,468 inhabitants who spoke an indigenous language, primarily Huasteca Nahuatl.

References

Municipalities of Hidalgo (state)
Populated places in Hidalgo (state)
Nahua settlements